Girl Next Room (Girl Next Room – ) is a 2020 Thai television series starring Worranit Thawornwong (Mook), Pathompong Reonchaidee (Toy), Juthapich Indrajundra (Jamie), Prachaya Ruangroj (Singto), Lapassalan Jiravechsoontornkul (Mild), Jumpol Adulkittiporn (Off), Sarocha Burintr (Gigie) and Jirayu La-ongmanee (Kao). Produced by GMMTV together with Gmo Films, it is a four-part series that follows the love lives of four occupants in an all-women boarding house, each presented through one of the four segments entitled Motorbike Baby, Midnight Fantasy, Richy Rich and Security Love.

The series was one of the twelve television series for 2020 showcased by GMMTV in their "New & Next" event on 15 October 2019. It aired on Sundays on GMM 25 and LINE TV at 20:30 ICT and 22:30 ICT, respectively. The premiere segment Motorbike Baby was broadcast on 1 March 2020 to 5 April 2020, followed by Midnight Fantasy (19 April 2020 to 10 May 2020) and Richy Rich (17 May 2020 to 14 June 2020). The last segment, Security Love, premiered on 21 June 2020 and concluded on 26 July 2020.

Synopsis

Motorbike Baby 
Sundae (Worranit Thawornwong) lives in Jamjan Boarding House owned by Mrs. Jam (Daraneenute Pasutanavin) and her son Sky (Trai Nimtawat). One strict rule is that no boys are allowed in the boarding house. However, Sundae is torn between her ex-boyfriend, Tankhun (Pathompong Reonchaidee) and a new potential love — who will she choose?

Midnight Fantasy 
First year college student Mimi (Juthapich Indrajundra) is a scaredy-cat who is used to being with her parents. As she starts living in Jamjam Boarding House away from her parents, her fears are heightened and aggravated by ghost stories surrounding the dorm. Because of this, she cannot sleep well at night which leads her to encounter DJ Titan (Prachaya Ruangroj), who hosts Middle Radio's program Midnight Fantasy from three to five in the early morning. Mimi is his sole, avid listener, who feels secure whenever she listens to him.

But listening to the program late at night and into the early hours causes Mimi to be too drowsy by morning. One day, she gets caught sleeping in her class and the angry professor instructs her and a fellow sleepyhead classmate Tan (Prachaya Ruangroj) to make a report together. As the two students work on their report, Mimi notices similarities between DJ Titan and Tan. Soon, she has to choose between the warm and kind DJ Titan and her mean and rude report partner Tan.

Richy Rich 
Danglek Saeyang (Lapassalan Jiravechsoontornkul) transformed herself from a poor girl to a rich, high-ranking lady in the name of Darin Apimaha-ngoenthong, aka "Duchess." She likes to show off because in the past, she was poor. By chance, she meets Krathing (Jumpol Adulkittiporn), to whom she had let slip her sad past. Krathing keeps on teasing Duchess, who risks her past being revealed to everyone.

Security Love 
View Viva (Sarocha Burintr), a famous rising star model, decides to live in Jamjan Boarding House where she meets Fai (Jirayu La-ongmanee), a security guard in the said edifice. As she continues to reap success from her career, she slowly falls in love with Fai who gets to help and protect her. However, her public image and the fear that the media may find out that she's dating a security guards is holding back their relationship.

Cast and characters

Main

Motorbike Baby 
 Worranit Thawornwong (Mook) as Sundae
 Pathompong Reonchaidee (Toy) as Tankhun

Midnight Fantasy 
 Juthapich Indrajundra (Jamie) as Mimi
 Prachaya Ruangroj (Singto) as Thaitan "Tan" Thitipakorn, aka DJ Titan

Richy Rich 
 Lapassalan Jiravechsoontornkul (Mild) as Danglek Saeyang / Darin "Duchess" Apimaha-ngoenthong
 Jumpol Adulkittiporn (Off) as Krathing Karnpiphob

Security Love 
 Sarocha Burintr (Gigie) as View Wiwa
 Jirayu La-ongmanee (Kao) as Faigun "Fai" Phuangmaha

Supporting

Appearing in all segments 
 Daraneenute Pasutanavin (Top) as Mrs. Jam, the owner of Jamjan Boarding House
 Trai Nimtawat (Neo) as Sky, Mrs. Jam's son

Motorbike Baby 
 Napat Patcharachavalit (Un) as TanThai, Tankhun's brother
 Gawin Caskey (Fluke) as Mile
 Sivakorn Lertchuchot (Guy) as Sunny, Sundae's brother
 Phurikulkrit Chusakdiskulwibul (Amp) as Thai
 Sutina Laoamnuaichai (Guide) as Sundae's friend

Midnight Fantasy 
 Krittanai Arsalprakit (Nammon) as James, Tan's friend
 Chanagun Arpornsutinan (Gunsmile) as Peemai
 Nawat Phumphotingam (White) as Daosao, Tan and Peemai's friend

Richy Rich 
 Jirakit Thawornwong (Mek) as Khunkhao Yothathap
 Lapisara Intarasut (Apple) as Benjamaporn "Honey" Meeprempi
 Wanwimol Jensawamethee (June) as Fahsai
 Sutthipha Kongnawdee (Noon) as Kratae Karnpiphob

Security Love 
 Chavalit Chittanant (Chao) as Phanphu

Soundtrack

Reception

Thailand television ratings 
In the table below,  represents the lowest ratings and  represents the highest ratings.
 N/A denotes that the rating is not known.

Motorbike Baby

Midnight Fantasy

Richy Rich

Security Love 

 Based on the average audience share per episode.
 Due to some ratings not recorded, the exact average rating is unknown.

Notes

References

External links 
 Girl Next Room on GMM 25 website 
 Girl Next Room  on LINE TV
 GMMTV

Television series by GMMTV
Thai romantic comedy television series
2020 Thai television series debuts
2020 Thai television series endings
GMM 25 original programming